Nezavisimoye Voyennoye Obozreniye, NVO (Independent Military Review) is a Russian weekly newspaper supplement to Nezavisimaya Gazeta dedicated to military posture, military science, activity of secret services, military technology, weapons, military history of Russia, as well as of other countries. It was founded by the editor-in-chief of the newspaper «Nezavisimaya Gazeta» Vitaly Tretyakov. Currently, the CEO and the editor-in-chief is Konstantin Remchukov. 

The first issue of NVO was published on February 11, 1995, the second in autumn of the same year. In 1996 it was published twice a month, since 1997 once a week.

The newspaper has often been relatively critical of Russian military policy and planning, especially in the light of current military reform.

References

External links 
  

Russian-language newspapers published in Russia
Publications established in 1995
Military of Russia
Mass media in Moscow